Evelyn Ferrara (December 12, 1909 – September 9, 1966) was an American athlete. She competed in the women's discus throw at the 1936 Summer Olympics.

References

1909 births
1966 deaths
Athletes (track and field) at the 1936 Summer Olympics
American female discus throwers
Olympic track and field athletes of the United States
Place of birth missing
20th-century American women